"Two Dollars in the Jukebox" is a song written and recorded by American country music artist Eddie Rabbitt.  It was released in November 1976 as the third single from the album Rocky Mountain Music.  The song reached number 3 on the Billboard Hot Country Singles & Tracks chart.

Charts

Weekly charts

Year-end charts

References

Songs about jukeboxes
Songs about music
1977 singles
1976 songs
Eddie Rabbitt songs
Songs written by Eddie Rabbitt
Song recordings produced by David Malloy
Elektra Records singles